Malvestiti is an Italian surname. Notable people with the surname include:

Edgardo Malvestiti (born 1969), former Argentine professional football player and currently manager
Federico Malvestiti (born 2000), Italian racing driver 
Maurizio Malvestiti (born 1953), Italian bishop of the Roman Catholic Diocese of Lodi
Piero Malvestiti (1899–1964), Italian politician

Italian-language surnames